The following lists events that happened during 1959 in the Belgian Congo.

Incumbent
Governor-general – Hendrik Cornelis

Events

See also

 Belgian Congo
 History of the Democratic Republic of the Congo

References

Sources

 
1950s in the Belgian Congo
Years of the 20th century in the Democratic Republic of the Congo
Belgian Congo
Belgian Congo